List of anti-aircraft weapons.  See also anti-aircraft warfare.

Canada 
 Air Defense Anti-Tank System (ADATS)
Oerlikon
 AMADS – Advanced man-portable air defence system

Finland 
 T-55A Marksman
 SAKO 23 mm/87
 23 ItK 95

France

Current

Gun systems 
 20mm Tarasque
 VAB VDAA
 Panhard ERC 20 Kriss

Missile systems 
 Aster / SAMP/T
 Crotale
 Mistral
 Roland
 Man-portable air-defense systems:
 Mistral MANPADS
 Air-to-air missiles
 MICA
 Nord AA.20, AA.25
 Meteor
 AC 3G
 Matra R.550 Magic

Former

Gun systems 
 25 mm Hotchkiss anti-aircraft gun
 AMX-13 DCA
 Canon de 37 mm Modèle 1925 
 Canon de 75 modèle 1897
 Canon de 75 antiaérien mle 1913-1917
 Canon de 75 mm modèle 1924
 Canon de 75 CA modèle 1940 Schneider
 Canon de 90 mm Modèle 1926
 Hispano-Suiza HS.404

Missile systems 
 Matra R.511
 Matra R.530
 Matra M.04

Germany 
 Flakpanzer Gepard
 LFK NG
 MANTIS
 Rheinmetall 20 mm Twin Anti-Aircraft Cannon
 Roland
 Wiesel 2 Light Air Defence System

India 
 Akash
 Akash-NG
 Bofors 40 mm L/60 gun (anti-aircraft)
 ZSU-23-4 self- propelled AA gun 
 VL-Astra 
 9K22 Tunguska
 SAMAR Air Defence System
 Barak 1
 Barak 8(MR SAM)
 SPYDER
 QRSAM
 9K38 Igla
 9K33 Osa
 S-125 Neva/Pechora
 S-200
 S-300
 S-400
 XRSAM

Iran 
 ZU-23-1,2 23mm AAA
 Samavat 35mm AAA
 Sa'ir 100mm AAA
 Mesbah 1
 Sayyad 1,2
 Shahab Thagheb
 Mersad
 Misagh-1,2
 Bavar 373
 Raad
 Ya Zahra
 Soheil
 S-300 (missile)
 S-200 Angara/Vega/D
 MIM-23 Hawk

Italy 
 Scotti 20/L77
 Breda M1935 20/L53
 M1941 90/L53
 SIDAM 25
 Aster missiles
 Aspide missiles

Japan

Imperial Japanese Army and Navy Land Forces (Second World War)

Light anti-aircraft 
 Type 98 20 mm AA Machine Cannon
 Type 2 20 mm AA Machine Cannon
 20 mm Twin AA Machine Cannon(double cannon)
 Type 4 20 m Twin AA Machine Cannon(double cannon)
 Model 96 25 mm AT/AA Gun
 AA Mine Discharger

Medium and heavy anti-aircraft 
 Model 96 25 mm AT/AA Gun(triple cannon)
 Vickers Type 40 mm AT/AA Gun(double cannon)
 Type 11 75 mm AA Gun
 Type 88 75 mm AA Gun
 Type 4 75 mm AA Gun
 Type 3 80 mm AA Gun
 Type 99 88 mm AA Gun
 Type 10 120 mm AA Gun
 Type 14 10 cm AA Gun
 Type 3 12 cm AA Gun
 Type 5 15 cm AA Gun
 12.7 cm/40 Type 89 naval gun

Self-propelled AA 
 Type 98 20 mm AAG Tank Ho-Ki
 20 mm AA Machine Cannon Carrier Truck
 20 mm Anti-Aircraft Tank "Ta-Se"
 Type 96 AA Gun Prime Mover
 Type 98 20 mm AA Half-Track Vehicle

Japan Ground Self Defense Force anti-aircraft equipment

Anti-aircraft land fixed/mobile Cannons 
 M42 40 mm Self-Propelled Anti-Aircraft Gun "Duster"
 Type 87 Self-Propelled Anti-Aircraft Gun 
 75 mm M51 Anti-Aircraft Gun

Surface-to-air missiles 
 Type 81 Surface to Air Missile
 Type 93 Surface to Air Missile
 HAWK Ground to Air Missile
 Type 3 Chū-SAM
 Type 91 surface-to-air missile

Japan Air Self Defense Force anti-aircraft equipment

Anti-air missile 
 NIKE-J Ground to Air Large-Sized Missile
 PATRIOT Ground to Air Missile

Anti-aircraft land cannon 
 Rheinmetall 20 mm Twin Anti-Aircraft Canon
 VADS (Vulcan Ai) Republic
 Raytheon MIM-104 Patriot
 Raytheon MIM-23 Hawk
 MBDA Mistral
 Crotale NG#K-SAM Pegasus
 Chiron (missile)
 KM-SAM

Myanmar

Gun systems 
 MAA-01 - 35mm AA guns
 25 mm self-propelled twin AA guns - locally made 25mm AA guns which are fitted on the locally made Mil-truk

Missile systems 
 MADV-1 - Self-propelled short range air defence system
 KS-1M - Medium-range air defence system

North Korea 
 S-25 Berkut
 SA-2
 SA-3
 SA-4
 SA-5 Gammon
 SA-6
 SA-7
 SA-17
 KN-06
 Pon'gae-6 (S-300)
 9K35 Strela-10

Norway 
 7.5 cm L/45 M/16 anti aircraft gun
 NALLADS (using Bofors RBS-70 missiles)
 NASAMS - Norwegian Advanced Surface to Air Missile System (using AMRAAM missiles)

Pakistan 
FIM-92 Stinger
Hongnu-5
M42 Duster
Rheinmetall 20 mm Twin Anti-Aircraft Cannon
HQ-16
Aspide
Anza (missile)
Crotale (missile)
RBS-70
HQ-7
LY-80
HQ-9

People's Republic of China 
 Hongqi-1
 Hongqi-2
 Hongnu-5
 Hongqi-7
 Hongqi-9
 Hongqi-10
 Hongqi-15
 Hongqi-17
 Hongqi-18
 Hongqi-61
 Kaishan-1
 Lieying-60
 PenLung-9
 Qianwei-1
 Qianwei-2

Missile Systems
 S-400

Poland

Current

Gun systems 
 ZU-23-2
 S-60MB
 KS-12
 KS-19
 Hibneryt

Missile systems 

 9K33 Osa
 2K12 Kub
 S-125 Newa SC
 S-200 Wega C
 Poprad
 Man-portable air-defense systems:
 Piorun
 Grom
 Strzała-2

Combined systems 
 ZUR-23-2S "Jod" and its variants, including PSR-A Pilica
 ZSU-23-4MP "Biała"

Former

Gun systems 
 PKM-4 and PKM-2
 20 mm Polsten
 ZSU-57-2
 ZSU-23-4

Missile systems 
 PZA Loara
 9K31 Strela-1
 9K35 Strela-10
 2K11 Krug
 S-75 Dźwina and modernized S-75M Wołchow (aka SA-2C)

Romania 
 CA-95
 Nike Hawk
 MIM-104C PAC-2 Patriot
 Flugabwehrkanonenpanzer Gepard
 CA-94
 9K33 Osa
 2K12 Kub
 ZU-2
 M 1980/88
 Oerlikon GDF
 AZP S-60
 MIM-23
 SA-2 Guideline
 ZSU-57-2

Russia/USSR

Gun systems 
 ZSU-37
 ZU-23-2
 ZSU-57-2
 S-60
 ZSU-23-4 Shilka
 61-K
 52-K
 ZPU
 KS-19

Missile systems 
 Kashtan CIWS
 M-11 Shtorm
 S-25 Berkut

 S-75
 S-125
 S-200
 S-300
 S-350E
 S-400
 S-500
 Pantsir-S1
 2K11 Krug
 2K12 Kub
 9K22 Tunguska
 9K31 Strela-1
 9K32 Strela-2
 9K33 Osa
 9K330 Tor
 9K34 Strela-3
 9K35 Strela-10
 9K37 Buk
 9K38 Igla

Combined systems 
 Kashtan CIWS
 9K22 Tunguska
 Pantsir-S1

Sweden 
 Bofors 20 mm gun
 Bofors 25 mm gun
 Bofors 40 mm L/60 gun
 Bofors 40 mm L/70 gun
 Bofors 57 mm L/60 gun
 Bofors 75 mm L/52 gun
 Bofors 75 mm L/60 gun
 Bofors 80 mm L/50 gun
 Bofors 105 mm L/50 gun
 RBS 70
 RBS 90
 RBS 23
 RBS 97

Switzerland 
 Oerlikon 20 mm cannon
 Oerlikon 35 mm twin cannon
 Oerlikon Skyshield 35 mm Revolver Gun System
 Oerlikon Millennium 35 mm Naval Revolver Gun System
 Air Defense Anti-Tank System
 Skyshield

Taiwan 
 Antelope air defence system
 T-82T 20mm Twin Anti-Aircraft Cannon
 Sky Bow series of Advanced Surface to Air Missile System

Turkey 
 Atılgan PMADS
 Zıpkın PMADS
 KORKUT
 HİSAR A+
 HİSAR O+
 SIPER
 S-400

United Kingdom

Guns
Vickers .50 machine gun
20 mm Polsten
QF 2 pounder naval gun
QF 3.7 inch AA gun
4.5 inch (114 mm) gun

Missile
 Bristol Bloodhound
 Blowpipe missile
 Javelin missile
 Rapier missile
 Sea Slug missile
 Sea Wolf missile
Starstreak missile
English Electric Thunderbird
Sea Cat/Tiger Cat missile
Sea Dart missile
Sea Ceptor CAMM (missile family)
Starburst surface-to-air missile

Other
Holman Projector
Unrotated Projectile
Z battery (2 inch rocket battery)

United States

Missile systems
 RIM-2 Terrier
 MIM-3 Nike-Ajax

 RIM-8 Talos
 MIM-14 Nike-Hercules
 CIM-10 BOMARC
 MIM-23 Hawk
 RIM-24 Tartar
 FIM-43 Redeye
 MIM-46 Mauler (project)
 LIM-49 Nike Zeus (project)
 RIM-50 Typhon LR (project)
 RIM-55 Typhon MR (project)
 RIM-7 Sea Sparrow
 RIM-66 Standard Missile-1 and 2 MR
 RIM-67 Standard Missile-2 ER
 MIM-72 Chaparral
 RIM-85 (project)
 FIM-92 Stinger
 M-1097 Avenger
 RIM-101 (project)
 MIM-104 Patriot
 RIM-113 (project)
 MIM-115 Roland
 RIM-116 RAM
 RIM-156 Standard Missile-2ER Block IV
 RIM-161 Standard Missile-3
 RIM-162 ESSM
 LAV-AD

Gun systems
 50 cal. MG
 M45 Quadmount
 Oerlikon 20 mm cannon
 3"/23 caliber gun (World War I, interbellum, World War II)
 3"/50 caliber gun (World War I, interbellum, World War II, Korean War, Cold War)
 5"/25 caliber gun (interbellum, World War II)
 5"/38 caliber gun (interbellum, World War II, Korean War, Cold War)
 6"/47 Mark 16 and 17 gun (Cold War, Korean War)
 75 mm Gun M1916 (World War I)
 75 mm gun M1897 (World War I)
 3-inch M1917 gun (World War I, interbellum, World War II)
 3-inch M1918 gun (World War I, interbellum)
 3-inch M3 gun (interbellum, World War II)
 105 mm M3 gun (interbellum, limited production)
 37 mm Gun M1 (some mountings added two .50 cal MGs) (interbellum, World War II)
 1.1"/75 (28mm) gun (interbellum, World War II)
 Bofors 40 mm gun (World War II)
 90 mm M3 gun (World War II – 1950s)
 120 mm M1 gun (World War II – 1950s)
 Skysweeper (early Cold War)
 M42 Duster (Cold War)
 M163 VADS "Vulcan"
 M247 Sergeant York (project)
 Phalanx CIWS

Yugoslavia 
 Zastava M55
 M-75

External links 
 

Antiaircraft weapons